Thomas Mordue (22 July 1905–1975) was an English footballer who played in the Football League for Hartlepools United, Hull City, Newcastle United and Sheffield United.

References

1905 births
1975 deaths
English footballers
Association football forwards
English Football League players
Hull City A.F.C. players
Horden Athletic F.C. players
Newcastle United F.C. players
Sheffield United F.C. players
Hartlepool United F.C. players